Euphorion is a German-language academic journal for history of literature. It was established in 1894 by August Sauer. From 1934 until 1944 it appeared under the title Dichtung und Volkstum.

Further reading 
 Wolfgang Adam: "Einhundert Jahre Euphorion: Wissenschaftsgeschichte im Spiegel einer germanistischen Fachzeitschrift". In: Euphorion, 88 (1994), 1–72.

External links 
 
 Print: 
 Online: 

German-language journals
Publications established in 1894
Literary magazines published in Germany